The 1995–96 Michigan Wolverines men's basketball team represented the University of Michigan in intercollegiate college basketball during the 1995–96 season. The team played its home games in the Crisler Arena in Ann Arbor, Michigan, and was a member of the Big Ten Conference.  Under the direction of head coach Steve Fisher, the team finished fifth in the Big Ten Conference.  The team earned an invitation to the 1996 NCAA Division I men's basketball tournament as a number seven seed where it was eliminated in the first round. The team was ranked for thirteen of the eighteen weeks of Associated Press Top Twenty-Five Poll, starting the season ranked seventh, peaking at number sixteen and ending unranked, and it also ended the season unranked in the final USA Today/CNN Poll.  The team had a 3–7 record against ranked opponents, including the following victories: December 9, 1995, against #18 Duke 88–84 at home, January 9, 1996, against #21 Illinois 83–68 at home, 1/21 #14  67–66 at home.

Dugan Fife served as team captain, while Maurice Taylor earned team MVP honors.  The team's leading scorers were Maurice Taylor (447 points), Louis Bullock (432 points), and Maceo Baston (375 points).  The leading rebounders were Maurice Taylor (223), Maceo Baston (211) and Albert White (150).

Baston posted a single-season field goal percentage of 68.16%, surpassing his own school record 67.42% set the prior year and establishing the current single-season record.

In the 64-team 1996 NCAA Division I men's basketball tournament, the team earned a number seven seed but was eliminated in the first round Midwest region game by the number ten-seeded Texas Longhorns 80–76 at the Bradley Center, ending the team's season on March 15, 1996.

Rankings

Team players drafted into the NBA
Four players from this team were selected in the NBA draft.

See also
1996 NCAA Division I men's basketball tournament
List of vacated and forfeited games in college basketball
University of Michigan basketball scandal

References

Michigan Wolverines men's basketball seasons
Michigan
Michigan
Michigan
Michigan